The New York Film Critics Circle Award for Best Screenplay is an annual film award given by the New York Film Critics Circle.

The most successful in this category were Woody Allen, Robert Benton, Ingmar Bergman, Kenneth Lonergan, Paul Mazursky, Quentin Tarantino and the author duo Alexander Payne and Jim Taylor, who each won the award twice. The Film Critics Association was able to present the Oscar winners in advance 20 times (13 times original screenplays, seven times adaptations).

Winners

1950s

1960s

1970s

1980s

1990s

2000s

2010s

2020s

References

New York Film Critics Circle Awards
Screenwriting awards for film